Dreams is the nineteenth album by Klaus Schulze. It was released in 1986, and in 2005 was the third Schulze album reissued by Revisited Records. The reissue bonus track was released early 2004 in Hambühren as a limited promo CD Ion.

Track listing
All tracks composed by Klaus Schulze.

Personnel 
Klaus Schulze – synthesizer, guitar, keyboards, vocals, engineer, digital mastering, mixing, electronics
Harald Asmussen – bass
Andreas Grosser – synthesizer, piano
Nunu Isa – guitar
Ulli Schober – percussion
Ian Wilkinson – vocals

References

External links
 Dreams at the official site of Klaus Schulze
 

Klaus Schulze albums
1986 albums